"Protect Ya Neck" is the debut single by American hip hop group Wu-Tang Clan, originally released in December 1992 through Wu-Tang Records and later re-released May 3, 1993 through Loud Records. The song appears on the group's debut studio album Enter the Wu-Tang (36 Chambers). It was produced by RZA and features eight of the original nine Wu-Tang members.

Background and composition
"Protect Ya Neck" was the first Wu-Tang song bringing together the original four members and four others (excluding Masta Killa, who had not yet joined). The single was originally released December 14, 1992 by Wu-Tang Records backed with the B-side "After the Laughter Comes Tears". After it created an underground buzz, Wu-Tang Clan signed with Loud Records and re-released it in 1993, with "Method Man" as the B-side, which sold 10,000 copies.

The album version of the song (even explicit versions of the album) is edited to scratch out all profanity, save for use of the word "nigga".  The song was originally recorded over a different beat and the verses in a different order before producer RZA decided to rearrange them and change the beat. The person who calls into a radio station at the start of the song was from an interview Wu-Tang Clan did on Washington, D.C. radio station WPGC. Different segments of the same interview are placed at different parts of their first album, Enter the Wu-Tang (36 Chambers).

Rapper Grand Daddy I.U. noted the swipe that GZA took at him on the song. Prior to the formation of the Wu-Tang Clan, GZA was originally known as The Genius – who, along with Grand Daddy I.U. – was signed to Cold Chillin' Records. GZA's verse was directed at his former label for lack of promotion over his debut Words from the Genius in favor of the former's debut album Smooth Assassin. Aside from the swipes at his former label, GZA also took a few swipes at I.U., to which I.U. discussed in 2006:

I was wearing the suit and tie shit back then on some old time gangster shit. He had that other shit like, ‘Girl come do me.’ I guess they wasn’t feeling that shit so they chose to push me harder than they pushed him. That ain’t my fault what the fuck are you mad at me for? So you know how that shit is. He ain’t gonna come to my face and say nothing so later on he put that shit in his little rhyme or whatever throwing a subliminal jab. That shit is neither here nor there.

"Protect Ya Neck" is featured on greatest hits compilations such as The RZA Hits, Disciples of the 36 Chambers and Legend of the Wu-Tang Clan, which contains the original, uncensored version known as the "Bloody Version". In 2000, Wu-Tang Clan would release a sequel on their third album The W, called "Protect Ya Neck (The Jump Off)", which also features Cappadonna and Masta Killa in place of the then-incarcerated Ol' Dirty Bastard.

"Protect Ya Neck" has been featured in video games True Crime: New York City, Skate 2, and WWE 2K22. The chime that opens the song is from the kung-fu movie Executioners from Shaolin. The song was featured in a promo for Saved by the Bell on MTV2

The "Protect Ya Neck / Method Man" single made The Source's 100 Best Singles list. In September 2010 Pitchfork Media included the song at number 5 on their Top 200 Tracks of the 90s.

It has also been featured in the final episode of superhero web television series The Defenders'' during a fight scene between all four Defenders and The Hand.

Music video
The music video features each Wu-Tang member in black and white rapping individually with their entourage in the background. As each rapper starts his verse, their rap aliases are shown on the screen. Many of these aliases are spelled incorrectly or never used on official releases such as Ghostface Killah being shown as "Ghost Face Killer" and GZA as the Jizah. In the video, occasionally clips of Wu-Tang as a full group in color are flashed for a couple seconds. It features a cameo appearance from a then-unknown Cappadonna during Raekwon and Method Man's scenes.

Track listing

Wu-Tang Records release

Loud Records release

Personnel
Credits adapted from single's label.

Production
Prince Rakeem – production, mixing, arranging

Additional personnel
Robert Diggs – executive production
Oli Grant – executive production
Dennis Coles – executive production
Mitchell Diggs – executive production

References

Wu-Tang Clan songs
1992 debut singles
1992 songs
2000 singles
Song recordings produced by RZA
Songs written by Method Man
Songs written by Raekwon
Songs written by Ghostface Killah